= John Sacré =

Canadian field hockey player

John Sacré (born 4 October 1958) is a Canadian former field hockey player.
